Wildcat (Yolanda Montez) is a fictional superheroine in DC Comics' shared universe, the DC universe. Her first appearance was in Infinity Inc. #12 (March 1985) and she was created by Roy Thomas, Dannette Thomas and Don Newton.

The character appeared in the television series Stargirl, portrayed by Yvette Monreal.

Character evolution

Roy and Dann Thomas originally intended to create a Canadian superheroine named "The Lynx" for new 1980s-era descendants of the All-Star Squadron. Later, in promotional material for the new Infinity Inc. series appearing in All-Star Squadron #28, a Catwoman like figure, riding what is referred to as a cat-cycle, appears alongside the Infinity, Inc. group. A caption refers to her as "La Garro". She however, never appears in any of the team's adventures, or its comics, but the character ultimately appears as Wildcat.

Fictional character biography
Maria Montez and her sister are given experimental drugs by the mad gynecologist Dr. Benjamin Love while they are pregnant. Doctor Love keeps close tabs on most of his experiments, but loses track of the sisters when they travel to Mexico. In Mexico, Maria's daughter Yolanda is born on the same day her sister gives birth to Carcharo. Yolanda and her mother return to America to reunite with her husband Juan "Mauler" Montez. As a child, Yolanda manifests her superhuman powers, but is unaware of why she was born a metahuman. She grows close to her godfather Ted Grant who is the mystery man Wildcat that operated during the 1940s. Years later during the Crisis, Grant is crippled while saving a child. Yolanda assumes his identity to honor her godfather and the principles he represented.

Ted Grant is at first annoyed with this new superheroine, but when he discovers she is his god-daughter, he gives Yolanda his blessing.

As the second Wildcat, she joins Infinity Inc. and fights alongside them. During her time on the team, she has a very flirtatious relationship with Nuklon even though he only has eyes for Fury. In a 1987 crossover special, Yolanda assists in the liberation of the country of Markovia from the influence of the Psycho Pirate. She stays with the team until it disbands.

Shadow Fighters
She withdraws from active heroing, but is later brought out of retirement to fight Eclipso. She joins a mixed team of superheroes, which include Major Victory, the first Steel, Creeper, Peacemaker and what is assumed to be the Mark Shaw Manhunter. They call themselves the Shadow Fighters. Several Shadow Fighters, including Wildcat, infiltrate the small country that Eclipso has conquered. Using various forms, he kills them all; Yolanda is slain personally with a stroke of his sword.

Several of the surviving members of the team risk their lives in order to retrieve the bodies of the dead. Her body was then brought by her mother to a witch who was able to bring Yolanda back to life, but was exposed as a scam by the original Wildcat.

Yolanda is also the cousin of former JSA Museum curator Alexander Montez, who later defeats Eclipso and takes control of his power using sacred tattoos to keep the power contained, all in an attempt to avenge Yolanda. Alex ultimately loses control of Eclipso when his tattoos are damaged, driving Alex to commit suicide by jumping off a building after Eclipso killed Alex's current lover Nemesis.

DC Rebirth
In the "Watchmen" sequel "Doomsday Clock", Doctor Manhattan undid the experiment that erased the Justice Society of America and the Legion of Super-Heroes in main continuity. Yolanda appeared with Ted Grant when both restored teams helped Superman defeat the rampaging metahumans.

Powers and abilities
Yolanda's superhuman powers include retractable claw-like fingernails and cat-like agility.

Other versions

Earth 2
After DC rebooted its continuity in 2011 as part of The New 52, Yolanda Montez appears in the series Earth 2: Worlds' End in 2014 as the Avatar of the Red on the world of Earth 2, the force of nature connected to "animal life", making her an analogue of Green Lantern (Alan Scott), who is the Avatar of the Green ("organic life", primarily flora) and Solomon Grundy, who is the Avatar of the Gray (death). The new interpretation of Yolanda is a red-haired Mexican student. She is shown to have acquired the role by intercepting the messenger of the Red, a horrible animal hybrid, as it came to claim her brother Alejandro as the Red's Avatar. Pleading with it to take her instead, she is instantly transformed into a large red demon with horns. She united with the other Avatars of the Parliament of Earth to face off against the New Gods, demonstrating an ability to shapeshift. Later, she is captured by the evil New God Desaad and transformed into an enormous, ferocious shapeshifting red monster loyal to Darkseid.

During the "Convergence" storyline, Yolanda is eventually restored to her original self upon surviving Earth 2's destruction.

In other media
Yolanda Montez appears in Stargirl, portrayed by Yvette Monreal. This version is a formerly popular girl, a fan of Ted Grant, and the ex-girlfriend of Henry King Jr. Three months prior to the series, she became an outcast when her rival Cindy Burman leaked a risqué photo she had sent to Henry during a school presidential election to ruin her candidacy, which also soured her relationship with her Catholic parents and led to her pouring her frustrations into boxing. Montez later takes up Grant's former costumed identity of Wildcat, at the request of Stargirl, to help rebuild the Justice Society. After forgiving Henry before he was killed by his father Brainwave, Montez would later avenge him by killing the latter. In season two, Montez takes up work as a part-time waitress, but suffers from PTSD as a result of her killing Brainwave. This eventually leads her to quitting being Wildcat after suffering hallucinations of Henry and Brainwave, though she later agrees to temporarily return to help the Justice Society defeat Eclipso. After Eclipso is defeated, Yolanda decides to remain with the Justice Society.
 Ahead of the series' premiere, Montez and the Justice Society made a cameo in the Arrowverse crossover "Crisis on Infinite Earths" via archive footage from the Stargirl episode "The Justice Society".

References

Characters created by Don Newton
Characters created by Roy Thomas
Characters created by Todd McFarlane
Comics characters introduced in 1985
DC Comics female superheroes
DC Comics metahumans
Mexican superheroes
Fictional werecats